Huntington is a city in Cabell and Wayne counties in the U.S. state of West Virginia. It is the county seat of Cabell County, and the largest city in the Huntington–Ashland metropolitan area, sometimes referred to as the Tri-State Area. A historic and bustling city of commerce and heavy industry, Huntington has benefited from its location on the Ohio River at the mouth of the Guyandotte River. It is home to the Port of Huntington Tri-State, the second-busiest inland port in the United States. As of the 2020 census, its metro area is the largest in West Virginia, spanning seven counties across three states and having a population of 359,862. Huntington is the second-largest city in West Virginia, with a population of 46,842 at the 2020 census. Both the city and metropolitan area declined in population from the 2010 census, a trend that has been ongoing for six decades as Huntington has lost over 40,000 residents in that time frame.

Surrounded by extensive natural resources, the industrial sector is based in coal, oil, chemicals and steel, all of which support Huntington's diversified economy. The city is a vital rail-to-river transfer point for the marine transportation industry. Also, it is considered a scenic locale in the western foothills of the Appalachian Mountains. Its location was selected as ideal for the western terminus of the Chesapeake and Ohio Railway, the predecessor of what would become CSX Transportation which still operates CSX Transportation-Huntington Division in the city to date. The railroad founded Huntington as one of the nation's first planned communities to facilitate the railroad and other transportation-related industries at the railway's western terminus. The site, previously a collection of agricultural homesteads, developed fast after the railroad's completion in 1871 and is eponymously named for the railroad company's founder, Collis Potter Huntington. The first identifiable permanent settlement, Holderby's Landing, was founded in 1775 in the Colony of Virginia. With the exception of the neighborhoods of Westmoreland and Spring Valley, most of the city is in Cabell County.

The city is the home of Marshall University as well as the Huntington Museum of Art; the Mountain Health Arena; the U.S. Army Corps of Engineers (Huntington District); the Collis P. Huntington Historical Society and Railroad Museum; Camden Park, one of the world's oldest amusement parks; the headquarters of the CSX Transportation-Huntington Division, the largest division in the CSX network; the Special Metals Plant; and the Port of Huntington Tri-State, the largest river port in the United States. The largest employers are Marshall University, Cabell Huntington Hospital, St. Mary's Medical Center, CSX Transportation, the U.S. Army Corps of Engineers, Amazon, DirecTV, and the City of Huntington.

Geography
Huntington is in the southwestern corner of West Virginia, on the border with Ohio, on the southern bank of the Ohio River, at the confluence with the Guyandotte River. The city lies within the ecoregion of the Western Allegheny Plateau. Most of the city is in Cabell County, for which it is the county seat. A portion of the city, mainly the neighborhood of Westmoreland, is in Wayne County. Huntington is commonly divided into four main sections. The north/south divider is the CSX railroad tracks, while the east/west divider is First Street. Residents of Huntington are called "Huntingtonians."

Huntington fills the roughly three-mile wide flood plain of the south bank of the Ohio River for eighty square blocks and portions of the hills to the immediate south and southeast.

Location and nomenclature

Huntington was founded on lightly populated lands near Guyandotte as a C&O Railroad hub, on the southern bank of the Ohio River, at the confluence with the Guyandotte River. The site is at the southwestern corner of West Virginia on the border with the state of Ohio and near the border of both states with Kentucky. Discounting the period of French ownership, the land that was part of Guyandotte and later Huntington was originally part of the 28,628-acre (115.85 km2) French and Indian War veteran's Savage Grant.

The area of greater Huntington, although situated in a Southern state, was long considered a western city in what was then the Colony of Virginia since the first permanent settlements were founded in 1775<ref
 name="FYIabout">FYI.com about Huntington, Published on Wednesday, August 3, 2011, accessdate=April 24, 2016</ref> in defiance of British injunctions against settlements west of the Alleghenies in the vicinity of Holderby's Landing.

Historically, the old Federal Era town of Guyandotte (now a neighborhood absorbed into Huntington proper) was first built upon in 1799 by French settlers of the Ohio Valley and has homes dating back to 1820 and a graveyard containing 18th-century French and colonial-era settlers, including surnames such as LeTulle, Holderby, and Buffington. A farmer James Holderby (1782–1855) purchased the lands in 1821 upon which much of Huntington now stands which is why the area was known as Holderby's Landing prior to 1870-71 when it was incorporated and renamed; Holderby's estate included the lands gifted in 1837 to found what is now Marshall University. The C&O purchased the area in 1870, and by 1873 when the railroad connected Richmond to Ohio, it had undergone a transition from a sleepy agricultural region with the nearby subscription Academy into a growing rail center poised to act as a springboard for a railroad to penetrate and connect the midwest with the eastern seaboard. The town of Guyandotte was officially absorbed in 1891.

Modern day Huntington is commonly divided into four main sections. The north/south divider is the CSX railroad tracks, while the east/west divider is First Street. A portion of the city, mainly the neighborhood of Westmoreland, is in Wayne County. Most of the city is in Cabell County, of which it is the county seat. Huntington is influenced by Appalachian Culture, Southern culture, Midwestern culture, and Mid-Atlantic culture. It is often referred to as one of the northernmost cities in the South or one of the southernmost cities in the North.
 
The Huntington Metro Area is sometimes called KYOWVA, an acronym that refers to the three states that make up the region, (Kentucky, Ohio, and West Virginia). As of the 2010 census, the Huntington Metro Area is the largest in West Virginia with a population of 365,419. Huntington is combined with Charleston, the state capital, as the Huntington-Charleston TV market, the 64th-largest in the nation.

History

The first permanent settlement in modern-day Huntington was founded in 1775 as "Holderby's Landing." The modern City of Huntington was founded by Collis P. Huntington and Delos W. Emmons as the western terminus for the Chesapeake and Ohio Railway (C&O) on a tract of land west of the mouth of the Guyandotte River, between the Ohio River and Twelve Pole Creek. Collis P. Huntington was one of the "Big Four" of western railroading who built the Central Pacific Railroad as part of the first U.S. transcontinental railroad (along with Leland Stanford, Mark Hopkins, and Charles Crocker).

Huntington was created as a hub for the C&O, which, once completed in 1873, fulfilled a long-held dream of the Virginias to have a rail link from the James River at Richmond, Virginia to the Ohio River Valley. The new railroad facilities adjacent to the Ohio River resulted in expansion of the former small town of Guyandotte into part of a large new city called Huntington. The C&O Railroad expanded east to Newport News (and coal piers), and west to eventually reach Cincinnati and Chicago in later years. After merging with several other railroads, C&O is now known as CSX Transportation.

The city was incorporated in 1871 just west of the earlier city of Guyandotte. Guyandotte, which became a neighborhood of Huntington in 1891, was founded in 1799 on land that was originally part of the  French and Indian War veteran's Savage Grant. Meriwether Lewis passed the Guyandotte and Big Sandy River peninsula on or about September 20, 1803, on his way down the Ohio River before meeting up with William Clark in Clarksville, Ind.

Huntington was the second American city to feature electric streetcars in the early years (after San Francisco), until they were gradually replaced with gasoline-powered buses. Some of the old trolley tracks can still be seen. Camden Park, which at 110 years old is one of the world's oldest amusement parks, was built in 1903 to encourage ridership on the trolleys (then owned by the Camden Interstate Railway Company).

Huntington's "boom" period occurred from the founding in 1871 until the Great Flood of 1937, which claimed 5 lives, caused millions of dollars in damage, left tens of thousands homeless, and led to the creation of Huntington's flood walls in 1938.
Of the 40,000 people living in the flooded areas of Huntington, 25,000 were made refugees as fresh water and fuel was scarce. 11,000 people applied for Red Cross aid during the flood and the relief period.

World War II brought another economic boom, but that was short-lived and ended along with the war in the 1940s. Huntington's population began to drop after 1950 because of urban sprawl and the decline of the steel and manufacturing industries. In the 1970s, federal urban renewal programs destroyed several parts of downtown. The industrial base continued to expand through the 1970s, but beginning in the early 1980s the steel and manufacturing industry in the region imploded, with massive layoffs and mill and plant closures.

A shift to the city's economic base began in the late 1980s to focus more on education, tourism, and services, based mainly on healthcare/medicine and biotechnology. Although Huntington successfully shifted the focus of its economy, the population has never rebounded to its industrial-era highs. While 86,353 people lived in the city proper in 1950, a combination of suburbanization and economic turbulence caused a sharp decrease in population to just 51,475 in 2000.

21st century

Huntington has seen a major revival since the opening of the Pullman Square Town Center on the vacant lot formerly known as the "Superblock" in 2005, the filming of the Warner Bros. motion picture We Are Marshall in 2006, and the filming of ABC's Food Revolution in 2010. The modern Huntington Metro Area spans 7 counties across 3 states and is the largest in West Virginia with a population of more than 360,000. The largest employers are Marshall University, Cabell Huntington Hospital, St. Mary's Medical Center, Amazon, DirecTV, and the City of Huntington.

Shortly after Pullman Square was constructed, the city began work on upgrading the streetscape on Fourth Avenue and Ninth Street. Ninth Street was formerly known as the Ninth Street Plaza and was closed to vehicle traffic for many years. Once anchored by Pullman Square on the north end, the old plaza was removed in 2006 and Ninth Street has once again become attractive to businesses. Fourth Avenue, known as the "Old Main Corridor", has been upgraded with new lighting, artistic and pedestrian-friendly design concepts, and bicycle lanes.

Efforts to redevelop Huntington started with the construction of the $10.5 million Huntington Civic Arena, which was the largest arena in the state when it opened in 1977. The 25-year delay in construction of what became Pullman Square caused the building to become a money losing effort for the city and is now managed privately by SMG. After renovation in 1997, and 2010, the arena has now been included in Billboard "New or Renovated Venues to Watch" list for 2013. Huntington's arena landed at No. 14 in a list of 17 venues across the globe. The exterior was also renovated in 2020-2021.

The culinary scene in the city has enjoyed a renaissance in the city since the early 2000s. Notable local restaurants include Fat Patty's, Jim's Spaghetti and Steak House, Backyard Pizza, Black Sheep Burrito and Brews, Navarino Bay, and Le Bistro.

The Huntington Mall, the largest mall in the state, opened a few years after the Arena in 1981. When the mall was built, the only other businesses around it were two bars and an Exxon gas station. Since the mall's opening, several retailers have built around the mall, including four hotels and several restaurants, as well as a Walmart Supercenter, the first Best Buy in West Virginia, and the first Sheetz gas station/convenience store in southern West Virginia. The Huntington Mall has a yearly economic impact of close to $400 million.

The Shops at Heritage Station are in the old Baltimore and Ohio Railroad Depot, originally constructed in 1887. The complex includes an original steam engine with a "Pullman" train car, and a building that used to house one of Huntington's first banks—which was the easternmost bank robbed by the James-Younger Gang. That structure is currently occupied by a specialty beer and cheese shop. Heritage Station was turned into a shopping center called "Heritage Village" during the dark days of Urban Renewal in the 1970s. For decades, the station sat hidden and virtually unused just two blocks from the city center, until Create Huntington got involved in 2006. Today, Heritage Station is an artisan retail complex, with locally owned shops, and home to public events like the annual Diamond Teeth Mary Blues Festival, named for the blues singer born in the town.

In 2017, Huntington joined a host of other municipalities and local governments in the area suing eight pharmaceutical companies, claiming their products harmed Huntington's welfare, leading to a drug crisis in the city and surrounding county. Included in the lawsuits are companies like McKesson Corp., Cardinal Health and AmerisourceBergen Drug Corp, among others.

Marshall University

At the time of Huntington's founding, Holderby's Landing was already the home of Marshall College State Normal School (now Marshall University). The university was founded in 1837 as a private subscription school by residents of Guyandotte and the surrounding area. The landmark Old Main, which now serves as the primary administrative building for the university, was built on land known as Maple Grove, at the time the home of the Mount Hebron Church in what was then the state of Virginia. John Laidley, a local attorney, hosted the meeting which led to the founding of Marshall Academy, which was named after Laidley's friend, the eminent John Marshall who had served as the fourth Chief Justice of the United States from January 1801 to July 1835.

On March 30, 1838, the institution was formally dedicated by the Virginia General Assembly as Marshall Academy. In 1858, the Virginia General Assembly changed the name to Marshall College. On June 20, 1863, Cabell County, Virginia, was one of the 50 counties separated from Virginia at the height of the American Civil War to form the State of West Virginia, and the college fell within the new state. In 1867, the West Virginia Legislature rededicated the institution as a teacher training facility and renamed it State Normal School of Marshall College. This began the history of the college as a state-supported post-secondary institution.

The university is composed of eight undergraduate colleges and schools: the College of Liberal Arts (COLA), the College of Fine Arts (COFA), the College of Education and Human Services (COEHS), the College of Information Technology and Engineering (CITE), the Elizabeth McDowell Lewis College of Business (LCOB), the College of Science (COS), the College of Health Professions (COHP), and the College of Arts and Media (CAM), and five graduate colleges, the general Graduate College, the Graduate School of Education and Professional Development, the School of Pharmacy, the School of Physical Therapy, and the Joan C. Edwards School of Medicine, a regional center for cancer research which has a national reputation for its programs in rural health care delivery.

Marshall's sports teams are known as the "Thundering Herd", a name deriving from a Zane Grey novel released in 1925. The home field for the football program is James F. Edwards Field at the Joan C. Edwards Stadium. Basketball is played at the Cam Henderson Center. Soccer is played at Veterans Memorial Soccer Stadium. Marshall participates in FBS for football) as a member of Conference USA. Sports at the school include women's softball, swimming & diving, tennis, volleyball, and track & field; men's football, baseball; and teams for both genders in basketball, cross country, golf, and soccer.

Southern Airways Flight 932

On November 14, 1970, a chartered Southern Airways McDonnell-Douglas DC-9 jet transporting 75 Marshall University football players, coaches, staff, and supporters crashed just short of the Tri-State Airport in adjoining Ceredo, West Virginia. Everyone on board was killed.

The story was dramatized in the Warner Bros. motion picture We Are Marshall, starring Matthew McConaughey and Matthew Fox. The film was released locally on December 12, 2006, and nationally on December 22, 2006. The movie depicts the aftermath of the aviation disaster for the families and university.

Climate
Because of its position in the westernmost and lowest area of the state, the city is on the northern limits of a humid subtropical climate (Köppen Cfa), unlike the "highlands" of West Virginia, which are in the Allegheny Mountains and the Appalachian Mountains. This location gives the city an even four seasons, with each season beginning around the calendar date. Huntington is made humid by the Ohio River, but summers are not as hot as they are further south and west. Snowfall generally falls in moderate amounts, accumulating an average  seasonally, and the greatest 24-hour fall was  during the March 1993 Storm of the Century. Each year on average, 24 days reach  and 16–17 days stay below freezing.

Cityscape

Huntington's central business district is directly between the Ohio River and the CSX Railroad track, east of the Robert C. Byrd Bridge, and west of Hal Greer Blvd (16th Street). There are also 2 smaller business districts: "Old Central City", well known for its antique shops, and one in Guyandotte. The city also has a wealth of architecture, including Gothic, Art Deco, and Edwardian Renaissance, along with many Craftsman, Colonial, Classical, and Tudor Revival homes.

Shortly after Pullman Square was constructed, the city began upgrading the streetscape on 9th Street and the "Old Main Corridor" section of 4th Avenue. 9th Street was formerly known as the Ninth Street Plaza and was closed to vehicle traffic for years, which effectively killed most businesses there. Once anchored by Pullman Square on the north end, the old plaza was removed in 2006 and 9th Street has once again begun attracting businesses. The section of Fourth Avenue that connects downtown to Marshall University, known as the "Old Main Corridor", was also upgraded. The corridor was upgraded with new lighting, artistic and pedestrian-friendly design concepts, and bicycle lanes.

Marshall University purchased the old Anderson-Newcomb/Stone & Thomas Building, which was built in 1902, with the intent of converting that historic structure into a state-of-the-art visual arts center. The goal being to raise the college's presence as an innovative institution, give the visual art program more space to expand, and afford students more opportunities to become engaged in community initiatives and improve the quality of life for everyone in the city.

Since its founding as the western terminus of the C&O Railroad, Huntington has served as a major break of bulk point between rail traffic and the Ohio River/Mississippi River watershed. The Huntington Division is still the largest in the CSX Transportation network. A large portion of the division's revenue comes from hauling coal out of the coalfields of West Virginia and Eastern Kentucky. The Huntington District is the largest of 10 operating divisions on the network. It serves the states of Kentucky, Tennessee, Virginia, West Virginia and Ohio. CSX's Huntington Division main office is in the historic former C&O passenger station downtown.

Several heavy industrial plants line the Ohio River and the Guyandotte River including the Port of Huntington-Tristate, the largest port in West Virginia and the 17th-largest in the United States. It is the nation's second largest inland port.

Neighborhoods
Huntington is commonly divided into four main sections. The north/south divider is the CSX railroad tracks, while the east/west divider is First Street. Within those sections, there are many neighborhoods, including:

Downtown
Downtown Huntington
Marshall University Campus

West
West Huntington
Old Central City
Westmoreland

South
South Side
Fairfield 
Beverly Hills
Southeast Hills
Enslow Park
South Hills
Harveytown
Ritter Park Historic District

East
Walnut Hills
Forest Hills
Altizer
Guyandotte
Highlawn
Arlington Park
Stamford Park

Downtown Historic District

The Downtown Huntington Historic District is a national historic district. The original district encompassed 59 contributing buildings; a boundary increase added 53 more contributing buildings. It includes the central business district and several municipal and governmental buildings. It contains the majority of the historic concentration of downtown commercial buildings.

Notable buildings include Huntington City Hall, Johnson Memorial United Methodist Church (c.1886/1912/1935), Trinity Episcopal Church (1882), Davis Opera House/Huntington Theater (c. 1885), Love Hardware Building (c. 1884), the Broh Building (1885), The Wesvanawha Building (1929-originally Lewis Building), the Anderson-Newcomb/Stone & Thomas Building (c. 1902), the Frederick Building (1906) the Morrison Building (1919), Keith-Albee Theater (1928), West Virginia Building (c. 1924), and the Gideon Building (c. 1915). In the district are the separately listed Carnegie Public Library, Cabell County Courthouse, U.S. Post Office and Court House, and Campbell-Hicks House. It was listed on the National Register of Historic Places in 1986. A boundary increase occurred in 2007. Most notably, the old Davis Opera House/Huntington Theatre has recently been redeveloped into vibrant commercial space featuring more than a dozen shops and restaurants.

 
Arguably, the most famous attraction in Huntington is Keith-Albee Theatre, a former Vaudeville palace in the "Art Deco" style from the 1920s and one of the architectural masterpieces of Downtown Huntington, on Fourth Avenue. Now known as the Keith Albee Performing Arts Center, the Keith was originally built in 1928 as the Keith-Albee Theater, and under the supervision of vaudeville tycoons B. F. Keith and Edward Albee as part of their Keith-Albee vaudeville circuit, the Keith-Albee was the second-largest theater in the United States at that time, behind the Roxy in New York City. The theater was designed by Thomas W. Lamb who designed approximately 153 theaters around the world. Only forty-three of these grand theaters are still open, and seventy-one have been demolished. "The Keith" has been undergoing a full restoration since 2009. This included the restoration of the famous front sign in 2012. After standing over Fourth Avenue for decades and being featured in hundreds of pictures and postcards, two Hollywood movie premieres, and being struck by lightning numerous times; the sign had to be taken down in 2011. A massive "Save Our Sign" effort was organized that funded the full restoration of the sign, which was reinstalled in May 2012.

Ritter Park Historic District

The Ritter Park Historic District is a national historic district in South Side. The district encompasses 68 contributing buildings and 5 contributing structures, including the Ritter Park municipal park. The city purchased the park property in 1908. Dwellings in the district represent a number of architecture styles popular from the years 1913 to 1940, including Colonial Revival, Bungalow/craftsman, and Tudor Revival. Notable buildings include the Ritter Park Apartments (1932), Weingartner House (c. 1923), Cammack House (1923), Marshall University President's House (1923), and Park Terrace Apartments (c. 1939–1940). It was listed on the National Register of Historic Places in 1990.

Other historical structures and museums
Huntington is home to "Central City", which is on the National Register of Historic Places. It is loosely bound by 3rd Avenue to the north, 5th Avenue to the south, 10th Street to the east, and 6th–7th Streets to the west.

Old Main at Marshall University, sits on Hal Greer Boulevard at 4th Avenue, in the Highlawn District, and is listed on the National Register of Historic Places. The Trustees of Marshall Academy purchased the land at Maple Grove for $40 in 1839. The building has been renovated several times. The 1870 renovation is the earliest section of Old Main to survive to the present.

The Huntington Museum of Art, in the hills above Ritter Park, features numerous collections and exhibitions; it is also home to the C. Fred Edwards Conservatory.

The Touma Museum of Medicine in downtown Huntington was established in 1994 to preserve the history of medicine, and to allow visitors to review a comprehensive regional medical museum. The only comparable museums can be found in cities such as Chicago, Boston, New York City and Washington, D.C. The collection houses thousands of pieces collected over a 25-year period by Joseph B. Touma, M.D.

Heritage Farm Museum and Village is an open-air village and series of museums relating to Appalachian Culture and History from the 19th century onward.

The Museum of Radio and Technology is near the west end of the park in a renovated elementary school. The Cabell County Courthouse and the Carnegie Library downtown also hold historical interest.

One block south, 5th Avenue is noted for its many historic church buildings. The city is also the site of an Adena Native American burial mound.

Traditional "drive-in" restaurants and hot dog stands are common in the city.

Demographics

2010 census
As of the census of 2010, there were 49,138 people, 21,774 households, and 11,000 families residing in the city. The racial makeup of the city was 86.9% White, 8.6% African American, 0.3% Native American, 1.1% Asian, 0.4% from other races, and 2.7% from two or more races. Hispanic or Latino of any race were 1.4% of the population.

There were 21,774 households, of which 22.9% had children under age 18 living with them, 32.2% were married couples living together, 13.7% had a female householder with no husband present, 4.6% had a male householder with no wife present, and 49.5% were non-families. 39.2% of all households were made up of individuals, and 12.5% had someone living alone who was 65 years of age or older. The average household size was 2.12 and the average family size was 2.83.

The median age was 35.4 years. 18% of residents were under age 18; 16.7% were 18 to 24; 25.8% were 25 to 44; 24.2% were 45 to 64; and 15.2% were 65 or older. The gender makeup of the city was 48.6% male and 51.4% female.

2000 census
As of the census of 2000, there were 51,475 people, 22,955 households, and 12,235 families residing in the city. The population density was 3,234.1 people per square mile (1,248.4/km2). There were 25,888 housing units at an average density of 1,626.5 per square mile (627.9/km2). The ethnic makeup of the city was 89.61% White, 7.49% Black or African American, 0.20% Native American, 0.82% Asian, 0.05% Pacific Islander, 0.30% from other races, and 1.53% from two or more races. Hispanic or Latino of any race were 0.85% of the population.

There were 22,955 households, of which 20.6% had children under age 18 living with them, 36.9% were married couples living together, 13.1% had a female householder with no husband present, and 46.7% were non-families. 37.6% of all households were made up of individuals, and 15.1% had someone living alone who was 65 years of age or older. The average household size was 2.12 and the average family size was 2.80.

In the city the age distribution of the population shows 17.7% under age 18, 17.5% from 18 to 24, 24.9% from 25 to 44, 21.8% from 45 to 64, and 18.0% 65 years old or older. The median age was 37. For every 100 females, there were 88.7 males. For every 100 females age 18 and over, there were 85.8 males.

The median income for a household in the city was $23,234, and the median income for a family was $34,756. Males had a median income of $30,040 versus $21,198 for females. The per capita income for the city was $16,717. About 17.5% of families and 24.7% of the population were below the poverty line, including 29.8% of those under the age of 18 and 12.5% of those 65 and older.

Government and politics

City Council

Since 1985 Huntington has operated under a strong mayor/city council form of government. The mayor is elected to four-year terms in partisan elections contested at the same time as United States presidential elections. The current mayor is former at-large councilman Steve Williams, a Democrat who is currently in his third term. Mayors in Huntington are term-limited to three terms and have the authority to veto acts of the city council.

The city also serves as the county seat of Cabell County. The Cabell County Courthouse is on a downtown parcel that covers an entire city block. Within the building are the offices for all of the county's elected officials and their employees, including the sheriff, county commissioners, county clerk, magistrates, and Circuit Court judges.

Huntington's city council members are elected to four-year terms at the same time as the mayor. There are eleven members of the council, nine of whom represent single-member districts, while the other two are elected at large. The city council has the authority to draft and debate ordinances and can override a mayoral veto with a two-thirds majority. There are currently nine Democrats and two Republicans on the city council.

 Peter Cline Buffington, 1871–1874
 Albert H. Woodworth, 1886–1887
 Edward S. Buffington, circa 1879
 Ely Ensign, 1896
 William F. Hite, circa 1897
 John Walton Ensign, circa 1906
 Floyd Sanford Chapman, circa 1912
 Edmund Sehon, circa 1915–1917
 E. N. Miller, circa 1917
 Charles William Campbell, 1919–1922
 Will E. Neal, 1925–1928
 J. Boyce Taylor, circa 1930
 Bobby Nelson, 1985-1993 (1st under "Strong Mayor / City Council" format)
 Jean Dean, 1993-2000
 David Felinton, 2001–2008
 Kim Wolfe, 2009–2012
 Stephen T. Williams, 2013- 

Honorary
 Justin McElroy, 2016- (honorary)
 Travis McElroy, 2016- (honorary)
 Griffin McElroy, 2016- (honorary)

Law enforcement
The Huntington Police Department (HPD) is the primary law enforcement agency serving Huntington. The Huntington Police Department traces its history to 1872 with the appointment of Isaac H. Mitchell as the first Town Marshal of the city. The current police department is composed of 92 sworn officers and a professional support staff of 6 civilians. Citing double-digit drops in overall crime, and drops of more than 20% in violent crime, HPD has been recognized by the U.S. Attorney's Office as the "Law Enforcement Agency of the Year" for 2011 and 2012. On November 1, 2021, Karl Colder was approved by the Huntington City Council to be the HPD Chief of Police. Colder previously worked with the DEA and is the first African American police chief in Huntington’s history.

Law enforcement and security for Marshall University is provided by the Marshall University Police Department. This protection includes the main campus area (including the streets on or immediately surrounding campus) as well as all other university owned or managed buildings and property, including the Marshall University Medical Center at Cabell Huntington Hospital.

As the enforcement arm of the Cabell County court system, the Cabell County Sheriff's Office is responsible for the security of the Court House and property, public schools, service of court-ordered writs, protective and peace orders, warrants, tax levies, prisoner transportation and traffic enforcement. Deputy Sheriffs are sworn law enforcement officials, with full arrest authority anywhere in Cabell County granted by the constitution of West Virginia and the county Sheriff.

In addition to both municipal and county law enforcement agencies, Huntington is also home to a detachment of the West Virginia State Police. Troopers from this detachment are assigned to both Cabell and Wayne counties and can serve as a backup to any neighboring counties.

Huntington Fire Department

The city of Huntington is protected by 106 professional firefighters of the Huntington Fire Department (HFD), founded in 1897. The department currently provides nine fully staffed companies with a complement of support staff and apparatus responding from six strategically located fire stations throughout the city. The six stations consist of six engine companies, two ladder trucks, a rescue truck, a marine unit, and several reserve engines, reserve utility trucks, and staff vehicles.

Huntington is on the southern bank of the Ohio River and is the river's largest port area. The Huntington Fire Department is capable of water/underwater rescue operations and is the host locality to the Regional # 6 West Virginia Regional Response Team which provides Hazardous Materials and Technical Rescue Team responses. The department holds a Class 2 rating from the Insurance Services Office (ISO) and was the first department in the State to achieve this status. Last departmental evaluation was performed in 2010.

In 2017, Jan Rader, the first paid female fire chief in the history of West Virginia, was sworn in as Chief of the Huntington Fire Department.

History
The problem of organizing for protection against fire was not given much thought until 1874, when A.C. Young and a group of associates organized a hook and ladder company. Young was given City Council authorization to contract for a hand-drawn hook and ladder truck. The Council approved $450 toward the purchase of the new truck. It was built locally by M.A. Jones, and Huntington's first fire company was born. In 1874, the city council enacted an ordinance creating a fire department to consist of an Engine Company, a Hose Company, and the previously formed Hook & Ladder Company. Mr. S. Sexton was named fire chief, and the personnel was all volunteer. in May 1875 the city purchased a hand-operated engine and a hand-drawn hose reel from Portsmouth, Ohio, for $725. To provide a water supply for the department, large 500 gallon cisterns were made in numerous locations in the city. On August 5, 1875, the organization was complete and the department was ready for action. A tower bell for alarms was bought in 1875 and more cisterns were placed in 1876.

Thomas Sikes was Captain of Hook and Ladder Co. No. 1, and Eustance Gibson was Captain of Excelsior Fire Engine and Hose Co. No. 2. Both were Civil War veterans, well known and respected early settlers. Many of the volunteer personnel composed of well known early settlers, merchants and professional men, many of whose descendants are living in Huntington today. In 1876 a night-watchman was hired at $3 per month to look after the station at night and sound the alarm in case of a fire. This was the first paid employee of the fire department. In 1879 J.W. Verlander became the first Fire Chief, and J.M. Boone became chief in 1880 until 1895. In 1881, four Gamewell Fire Alarm Boxes were installed in the downtown area. These fire alarm boxes were maintained by the telephone company. The system kept growing, and in 1928 construction was completed on a new Gamewell Fire Alarm System and Fire Alarm Headquarters were placed in operation in 1929, and remained in service until 7:32AM November 1, 1986. The Gamewell Fire Alarm System served the City of Huntington faithfully for 105 years. There never was a loss of life or major disaster because of a system malfunction.

In 1883 the department first and only horse-drawn steam fire engine was purchased from the Ahrens-Fox Fire Engine Company of Cincinnati. The engine was brought up the Ohio River to Huntington on a steamboat. Also in 1883 the department was reorganized on a part-paid basis, but continued to be largely volunteer until 1897 when the department was again reorganized with a paid chief, four paid drivers and a force of firefighters who were paid by each alarm they answered. Each firefighter held down regular jobs the rest of the time. This was the beginning of Huntington's full-time paid fire department.

From 1913 to 1915 five pieces of motorized equipment were bought for the department. These consisted of a chief's car, two hose trucks, a pumping engine and an  aerial ladder truck. This was the beginning of motorization. In April 1926 the last two teams of horse-drawn hose companies were led away from Hose Companies No. 5 in Guyandotte and No. 6 in Walnut Hills.. The day of the dashing fire horse was over. The old St. Clouds Fire Station is the city's reminder of the horse-drawn era. The horse-bitten window sills still remain today.

In February 1929 Huntington's firefighters were issued a charter establishing a local union. Under the International Association of Fire Fighters, Huntington's firefighters were given the 289th local in the U.S. and Canada

The Fire Prevention Bureau was established in the early fifties, because of the increasing number of fires in homes and businesses, along with the city's Fire Prevention Week. Early functions of the Bureau included the Fire Prevention Parade and a contest to select Miss Flame, a beauty queen to reign over the weeks activities. All contestants in the competition were required to have red hair in the earlier years. The Fire Prevention Parade was held the first Monday in October, and a tradition that is carried on today since the fifties. Fire Departments from West Virginia, Ohio, and Kentucky participate annually in Huntington's Fire Prevention Parade. The Huntington Fire Department implemented the School Fire Patrol Program in the city in 1950. This programs said to be one of the oldest in the nation today. Other events in the mid to late fifties included the establishment of the Tri-State Fire School. The Tri-State Fire School is still used today to train firefighters.

In 1965, the city built its first new fire station since 1926. The city's 100th birthday was commemorated when the Centennial Fire Station was placed in service on January 13, 1972, replacing the long-outmoded Central Fire Station. The Centennial Fire Station is still in service today. In 2004, a new station was opened that replaced St. Cloud station 4. The old station has been in service as a fire house for over 100 years. It now houses the traffic division for the City Of Huntington. The 1980s were tough for the department, several firefighters retired, and budget cuts forced the closure of several stations. The Gamewell Fire Alarm System was deactivated and Fire Alarm Headquarters closed. (The Old Fire Alarm Headquarters has been converted into a fire museum today.) Dispatching was combined with the Police Department, marking the beginning of 911 emergency dispatching.

Health care

The two largest hospitals in Huntington are St. Mary's Medical Center and Cabell Huntington Hospital. St. Mary's and Cabell Huntington, both owned and operated by Mountain Health Network, are jointly designated as the only trauma center in the region. St. Mary's is the largest medical facility Huntington and the second largest in the tri-state region at 393 beds. The medical center is the largest private employer in Cabell County with over 2,600 employees. As a teaching facility associated with the Marshall University Joan C. Edwards School of Medicine, St. Mary's trains medical residents in several specialties. The hospital campus is home to the St. Mary's School of Nursing, the St. Mary's School of Radiologic Technology, and the St. Mary's School of Respiratory Care. All three programs are associated with Marshall University. St. Mary's is also home to a regional heart institute, regional cancer center, and regional neuroscience center.

Cabell Huntington Hospital is a not-for-profit, regional referral center with 303 staffed beds. Cabell Huntington cares for patients from more than 29 counties throughout West Virginia, Kentucky and Ohio. Opened in 1956, it is also a teaching hospital and home to the Marshall University Medical Center, which includes the Joan C. Edwards Schools of Medicine and Nursing. Cabell Huntington is also home to the Edwards Comprehensive Cancer Center, the Hoops Family Children's Hospital, and the Robert C. Byrd Center for Rural Health; a distinguished leader nationwide for rural health care delivery.

The Huntington Veteran's Administration (VA) Medical Center, on Spring Valley Drive, is an 80-bed medical and surgical care facility that offers primary inpatient and outpatient care, along with mental health services and subspeciality outpatient options. It is also the primary teaching facility for the Marshall University School of Medicine and is also affiliated with the University of Pikeville Kentucky College of Osteopathic Medicine. In 1993, the Robert C. Byrd Clinical Addition expanded the hospital's surgery, radiology, laboratory, cardiology, nuclear medicine, and rehabilitation services and renovated inpatient care facilities. In 1998, a $10 million research facility was completed. The hospital is also the home of the Marshall University School of Pharmacy.

The city is also home to the state's largest psychiatric hospital, Mildred Mitchell-Bateman Hospital.
Huntington also is known for several health issues including opioid addiction and morbid obesity being featured on Jamie Oliver's food revolution after being voted "the fattest city in America" in the late 2000's

Economy

The growth of Huntington and its economy was originally based on steel processing, shipping, manufacturing, and transportation through the 1970s, then the city experienced deindustrialization which cost residents tens of thousands of low-skill, high-wage jobs. Huntington has since been adapting to the collapse of the region's steel industry. The primary industries have shifted to high technology, such as, the film and television industries, health care, biomedical technology, finance, tourism, and the service sector. The Amazon Customer Service Center in Huntington employs approximately 500–700 people.

Huntington has grown its economic base in recent years to include technology, retail, finance, education, and medical care (which constitutes the largest proportion of the city's employment). The largest employers are Marshall University, Cabell Huntington Hospital, St. Mary's Medical Center, Amazon, DirecTV, and the City of Huntington.

Area retail is anchored by the Huntington Mall, the largest mall in the state, and a healthy downtown retail sector including many boutique shops along the Old Main Corridor, Third Avenue, and Pullman Square.

The newest area of development is Kinetic Park, a premier technology park on Sixteenth Street, 1/4 mile north of interstate 64. The flagship of the development is Amazon's new . Customer Service Center, which opened in November 2011. Other development in Kinetic Park includes a Spring Hill Suites by Marriott hotel, a Hampton Inn hotel, a Bob Evans restaurant, Goldy Chrysler, and the Huntington Pediatric Dentistry and Orthodontics clinic.

The first large manufacturing business in Huntington was the Ensign Car Works, founded in Huntington in 1872 by Ely Ensign and William H. Barnum, who managed a car wheel manufacturing company, the Barnum and Richardson Company, in Connecticut. The company was incorporated on November 1, 1872. Financing was provided primarily by Barnum and Collis P. Huntington, who was one of the principals in the Central Pacific Railroad and founder of the City of Huntington.

For the first ten years of production, Ensign manufactured iron parts such as railroad car wheels. The company began building wooden freight cars in the early 1880s, selling a large portion of its inventory to the Chesapeake and Ohio, Southern Pacific and Central Pacific railroads, all of which were controlled by Huntington. In 1962, the Huntington ACF plant began building a revolutionary new design that quickly became the standard of the rail car industry. The car, known as the CenterFlow covered hopper car, was developed by ACF to transport huge volumes of light-weight, high-bulk commodities, such as plastic pellets. By 1992, ACF had manufactured more than 100,000 hopper cars. The sprawling ACF Industries rail car plant once had many as 1,600 employees with an annual payroll of $30 million. Now, reports indicate only four people work there – and three of them are security guards.

 Since its founding as the western terminus of the C&O Railroad, Huntington has served as a major break of bulk point between rail traffic and the Ohio River/Mississippi River watershed. The Huntington Division is still the largest in the CSX Transportation network. A large portion of the division's revenue comes from hauling coal out of the coalfields of West Virginia and eastern Kentucky. Much of the coal is brought to the Port of Huntington-Tristate by train to be transported by river barges to industrial centers in other states.

Huntington is in the company's Southern Region and is the largest of ten operating divisions on the network. The division comprises the former railroads Chesapeake and Ohio (C&O); Baltimore and Ohio (B&O); Western Maryland (WM); Louisville and Nashville (L&N); and the Clinchfield. It serves the states of Kentucky, Tennessee, Virginia, West Virginia and Ohio. CSX's Huntington Division main office is in the historical former C&O passenger station downtown. The office is home to a regional office that is home to the divisions's top managers, a centralized yardmasters and train dispatchers center, a freight car light repair shop and a locomotive heavy repair facility in the city.

Huntington is also home to Heiner's Bakery. Founded in 1905, Heiner's employs nearly 500 people in its  facility. The bakery was privately owned by the Heiner family, and marketed exclusively under the "Heiner's" label until it was acquired by the Earthgrains division of Anheuser-Busch in 1994. Six months later, A-B spun off its bread business as the stand-alone Earthgrains Corporation. In 2000, Earthgrains merged with the Sara Lee Corporation. In 2011, Sara Lee sold its bread business, including the trademark Sara Lee, to the worldwide Grupo Bimbo, which is based in Mexico City. Today the bakery markets under the "Heiner's", "Earthgrains", "Sara Lee" and "Bimbo" brands.

Huntington is still a base for the metalworking and welding trades with the repair of railroad rolling stock, barges, and river boat equipment. Major fabricating firms—such as Huntington Special Metals, Steel of West Virginia, Martin Steel, Huntington Plating, Richwood Industries, Evans Welding and Fabricating Co, and Hammers Industries—serve the railroads, river transportation, steelmaking, coal, oil, natural gas, electrical, windpower, biofuel, and other important industries.

Culture
Huntington is influenced by Appalachian Culture, Southern culture, Midwestern culture, and Mid-Atlantic culture.

The Keith-Albee Performing Arts Center is in Huntington.

The 2006 Warner Bros. motion picture We Are Marshall, the 2010 ABC series Jamie Oliver's Food Revolution, the 2017 television series My Brother, My Brother and Me, and the Netflix documentary "Heroin(e)" were all filmed in the city.

Annual events and fairs
Huntington is home to numerous events and fairs throughout the year.

Parks and trails

Huntington is home to eleven public parks around the city, and an amusement park just west of the city. The most frequented being Harris Riverfront Park in the downtown and Ritter Park in South Side. Camden Park, an amusement park, is also adjacent to the city. Camden Park is West Virginia's only amusement park. The park has been open since 1903.
Pullman Square features many restaurants and shops and a stage for live performances.

Harris Riverfront Park

Harris Riverfront Park is downtown, on the Ohio River. After years of sluggish usage from the general public, the park has seen a renewed interest in recent years from citizens, city government, media and local businesses. The public land continues to host a number of concert and music events, including free open-air movie showings, and was included in citywide construction of additional surveillance cameras which will provide free public-access wireless internet connections. The park is situated between the city flood wall and the Ohio River, and is noted for its scenic riverview and grassy recreational area.

Ritter Park
The crown jewel of the public park system is Ritter Park (named for Charles L. Ritter, who donated the land), on land originally purchased as the site for an incinerator. The park is maintained by the Greater Huntington Park and Recreation District. It was created in 1913 by Rufus Switzer, a city council member of West Virginia. It consists of numerous lengthy walking and cycling trails along Four Pole Creek, which runs the entire length of the park and is crossed by many wooden and stone footbridges. There are also restroom facilities, picnic tables, a shelter with grills and electrical outlets, a children's playground, an amphitheater for small concerts and plays, an award-winning rose garden, and a new dog park.

 
The park was officially opened in September 1913. Architect Gus Wofford was hired by the city to design the park and its amenities. His works continued till the 1930s and includes bridges that cross streams, tennis courts, greenhouse, and picnic facilities. It is in the Ritter Park Historic District, listed on the National Register of Historic Places in 1990.

Ritter Park is one of the 2012 Great Places of America listed by American Planning Association (APA). Every year APA selects great places having true sense of place, culture and historic interest, community involvement, and a vision for tomorrow. The list of "APA Great Places" is a very useful and informative source for local residents and tourists who are looking for an enjoyable public place. Ritter Park is one of the busiest places in Huntington, but still maintaining its peaceful and serene environment.

The Rose Garden and the playground are among the amenities of the Ritter Park that attract tourists. The Rose Garden, including the "Room with a View", is used for weddings and special occasions. The Rose Garden has more than 3,500 rose plants. The garden bordered by stone walls is designed to place benches for the events. In addition to the weddings, the annual Rose Show and the Summer Nature Programs are presented here. Each year the roses are tested and provided by the American Rose Society.

Paul Ambrose Trail for Health (PATH)

The Huntington area has wrestled with health problems for several years, problems that were highlighted in 2010 by the television show Jamie Oliver's Food Revolution on ABC.

One such project has been the Paul Ambrose Trail for Health (PATH). This is a growing, bicycle and pedestrian trail system in the City of Huntington. It is designed to create interconnected loops around each of the neighborhood parks that would create recreational opportunities and an alternative means of transportation around the city. The namesake, Dr. Paul Ambrose, was a promising young physician who was killed at the Pentagon in the terrorist attacks on September 11, 2001. Dr. Ambrose was dedicated to family health and preventive medicine to fight obesity and the trail system is a way for his efforts to have a lasting effect in Huntington.

The Rahall Transportation Institute Foundation, in association with the City of Huntington and various community members, has designed this trail system to incorporate many of Huntington's amenities and workplaces to allow the citizens of Huntington an alternative means of transportation.

Memorial Park
Memorial Park is at 1301 Memorial Boulevard. It contains a walking trail, a small playground, a picnic shelter, and a small restroom. It formerly included a large swimming pool that featured two slides, but was abandoned and demolished in 2006. The two-mile (3 km) walking trail merges with the one-mile (1.6 km) trail around the main Ritter Park at 8th Street & North Blvd.

Huntington's Veterans Memorial Arch is a historic memorial arch in Memorial Park. It was built between 1924 and 1929 by the Cabell County War Memorial Association as a memorial to the dead and to those who served the county in World War I. It is built of gray Indiana limestone on a gray granite base. It features Classical Revival style bas-relief carvings. The structure was rededicated in 1980. It is the only triumphal style arch in West Virginia. It was listed on the National Register of Historic Places in 1981.

Harveytown Park
Harveytown Park is one of the newest parks in the Harveytown district. It currently features six picnic tables, one of which is handicap accessible, an electrical outlet, a grill, water fountain, and restrooms. Construction on Phase I of the new park began on October 28, 2003. The financing and co-ordination was a joint effort between the city of Huntington, HUD CDBG funds, and the Greater Huntington Park and Recreation District. During Phase I, the initial park site was cleared and prepared, underground utilities were installed, a main entrance and parking lot was constructed, and the picnic shelter was installed. The shelter was unique in that it was both aesthetically pleasing and functional. Possible expansion plans include a skateboard facility, bicycle trails and tennis courts.

Camp Mad Anthony Wayne
Camp Mad Anthony Wayne is on Spring Valley Drive. Named for "Mad" Anthony Wayne, a frontier army general, it contains vast open grounds, swings and sliding boards, hiking trails, a disc golf course, numerous picnic tables, an open campfire circle, and a lodge. The facility sleeps 28 and contains a bathroom and shower facilities. It is host to two large wood-fired fireplaces. Part of the park was listed on the National Register of Historic Places in 2002. The eight historic buildings are the camp lodge building (1931), four nearly identical gable roofed, stone, rustic vernacular cottages dated to 1942; a gable-roofed, stone, rustic vernacular caretaker's house and two associated outbuildings, dated to 1944. The lodge is a gable-roofed, brick, rustic vernacular building.

Camden Park

Camden Park is a  amusement park near Huntington. It is a traditional park home to over 30 rides and attractions. The park features two of the three remaining roller coasters built by National Amusement Devices. The Big Dipper, a wooden roller coaster constructed in 1958, features the original Century Flyer cars complete with headlights and detail work. The coaster is classified as an ACE Coaster Classic by the American Coaster Enthusiasts. The park's second coaster, the Lil' Dipper was completed in 1961 and is also an ACE Coaster Classic. The park is also home to several entertainment events which take place throughout the year: Children's Festival, Hot Summer Nights Concert Series, Coca-Cola Days, and Halloween Spooktacular.

Camden Park also is a playable location in the video game Fallout 76.

Camden Park was originally built in 1903 at the western terminus of the trolley line (then owned by the Camden Interstate Railway Company) to encourage ridership. Camden Park is now owned by the Boylin Family. This is the second generation of Boylins owning and operating West Virginia's only amusement park. J. P. Boylin transformed Camden Park from a carousel to an amusement park in 1950. By the late 19th century almost every large town in America had streetcars and many had parks to boost weekend and holiday traffic. Originally developed as a picnic area by the Camden Interstate Railway in 1903 Camden Park has survived into the 21st century as a thriving traditional amusement park. Over the years Camden Park has been the setting for baseball games, tens of thousands of picnics, fairs, marathon dances, roller derbies, flagpole sitting, a swimming pool, a zoo, plus numerous attractions and rides.

Beech Fork State Park

The park is on the tailwater shores of Beech Fork Lake, a flood control impoundment of the U.S. Army Corps of Engineers on the Beech Fork of Twelvepole Creek. Since its development in the mid 1970s, Beech Fork State Park has proved to be a popular recreation spot for the residents of nearby Barboursville and Huntington, as well as those living in the surrounding region. Access to the park is also available from Exits 8, 15, and 20 of I-64. The Beech Fork Lake Dam and Marina are about a 20-mile (40 minute) drive from the park.

Beech Fork State Park is home to Beech Fork Lake, a  reservoir near Lavalette in Wayne County, West Virginia. Beech Fork Lake is also partly located in neighboring Cabell County. Millers Fork and Stowers Branch join Beech Fork with their own river valleys contributing to the majority of the lake surface of Beech Fork Lake. These streams are tributaries of Twelvepole Creek.

Beech Fork Lake as a flood control impoundment was authorized by the Flood Control Act of October 23, 1962 and was constructed by the U.S. Army Corps of Engineers in the mid-1970s. The lake was completed and dedicated in May 1978.

Known in agrarian times as the "Bean Capital of the World" because of its abundant harvests, remote Beech Fork and its fertile farms had by the mid-20th century devolved into a "Tobacco Road" cut off from the opportunities of modern development. Some tombstones in the Park's Bowen Cemetery date to the 18th century; and family names adorning Civil War graves can be seen on roadside mailboxes even today. Government appropriation of private land for the lake caused rancor among locals with historic land holdings. The Beech Fork strain of Adkins family (appropriately known as "Beech Fork Adkinses") was largely driven out to the Huntington metropolitan area. So numerous were these displaced persons that townsfolk joked about an "Adkins factory" at Beech Fork which mass-produced persons of the surname. It has also been said that in the last days, "the Jews will go back to Palestine and the Adkinses will go back to Beech Fork."

Sports

Huntington's sports scene is dominated by Marshall University athletics and Huntington Prep basketball.

The Thundering Herd
Marshall's sports teams are known as the Thundering Herd. The school colors are kelly green and white. Marshall participates in FBS for football as a member of The Sun Belt Conference. The name Thundering Herd came from a Zane Grey novel released in 1925, and a silent movie of the same name two years later. Marshall teams were originally known as the Indians, and the green-white colors came in 1903, replacing black and blue. The Herald-Dispatch sports editor Carl "Duke" Ridgley tagged the team with the Thundering Herd name, but many other nicknames were suggested over the next thirty years, including Boogercats, Big Green, Green Gobblers, Rams, Judges and others. In 1965, students, alums and faculty settled on Thundering Herd in a vote, and Big Green was given to the athletic department's fund-raising wing.

Sports at the school include women's softball, swimming and diving, tennis, volleyball, and track and field; men's football, baseball; and teams for both genders in basketball, cross country, golf, and soccer. Marshall also fields club teams, not affiliated with the MU Athletic Department, in rugby union for both women and men, men's and women's lacrosse, and an equestrian team that competes in the Intercollegiate Horse Show Association.

Huntington Prep

In 2012, Huntington Prep was ranked as one of the top ten basketball teams in the nation and had the top high school player in the class of 2013, Andrew Wiggins. As of 2012, all students were considered NCAA Division I prospects and recruited by some of the top programs in the country. Huntington Prep is housed within St. Joseph Central Catholic High School, a religious school. The students are regular St. Joseph's students and must abide to the rules and regulations of the high school. Practice is held in the Recreation Center at Marshall University, with "home" games played at local high schools, the Cam Henderson Center, and formerly at the now demolished Veterans Memorial Fieldhouse.

The team's nickname is the "Express" which is a derivative of the nickname of the former Huntington High School, "Pony Express", and the city's railroad heritage. (The current Huntington High is a consolidation of the original Huntington High and Huntington East High School, and took East's nickname of "Highlanders".) The school colors are Carolina blue and yellow. None of the players are from West Virginia, as Coach Rob Fulford does not want to take West Virginia players away from their local teams. Instead, all the players are recruited and attend St. Joseph's. Because of this, the school is excluded from playing West Virginia teams by the West Virginia Secondary School Activities Commission, which is the state's high school sanctioning body.

Professional sports

Arena Football
The Mountain Health Arena was formerly the home of the River Cities LocoMotives (2001) and the Huntington Hammer (2011–2012), both members of the Ultimate Indoor Football League, and the Huntington Heroes indoor football team in the American Indoor Football League (2006–2008).

Minor League Baseball
Huntington has a long history of baseball clubs, starting with the Huntington Blue Sox (1911–1916). Other clubs include: the Huntington Boosters (1931–1933, 1937 & 1939), the Huntington Red Birds (1934–1936), the Huntington Bees (1938), the Huntington Aces (1940–1941), the Huntington Jewels (1942), and the Huntington Cubs (1990–1994). The Huntington Cubs played in the Appalachian League, and were affiliated with the Chicago Cubs. Their home stadium was at St. Cloud Commons.

Other sports 
Huntington was also home to the Huntington Stars (1939–1941), the Huntington Hornets (1956–1957), and the Huntington Blizzard (1993–2000) ice hockey teams. The Blizzard played at the Mountain Health Arena, the Hornets played at the Veterans Memorial Fieldhouse, and the Stars played at the former Iceland Arena. Marshall University has a club ice hockey team.

Huntington is home to the Jewel City Roller Girls, a women's roller derby team that was founded in 2010.

Media

Print
Huntington has one of West Virginia's largest daily circulating newspapers, The Herald-Dispatch, with an average weekday circulation of just over 25,000.) The paper is locally owned by HD Media Co. LLC. Huntingtonnews.net has been online since 2000 and is a local Independent news source owned by Matthew Pinson.

The Parthenon, Marshall University's independent student newspaper has a weekly print circulation of 6,000 and is distributed around Marshall's campus.

Television
Note - all stations listed serve both Huntington and Charleston, as both cities comprise a single TV market

Radio
Note: These are the only stations that are licensed to the city of Huntington.

Education

The residents of Huntington are served by the Cabell and Wayne County School Systems, which include Huntington High School, Cabell Midland High School, Spring Valley High School, Cabell County Career Technology Center, five middle schools, and 19 elementary schools. Private schools include the St. Joseph Catholic School (a regionally accredited, parochial school), Grace Christian School (a regionally accredited, evangelical school), and Covenant School.

Huntington is home to colleges and universities including Marshall University and one of its graduate schools, the Joan C. Edwards School of Medicine, the Robert C. Byrd Institute for Advanced Manufacturing, Mountwest Community & Technical College, the Huntington Junior College, St. Mary's Medical Center's School of Medical Imaging, School of Nursing, and School of Respiratory Care, as well as the Tri-State Institute of Pharmaceutical Sciences.

The Cabell County Public Library system operates a main branch downtown and seven branches in neighboring towns.

Transportation

Interstates and highways
The roads of Huntington, West Virginia include one major interstate, Interstate 64; two U.S. highways, U.S. Route 60 and U.S. Route 52; 6 state routes; and numerous major thoroughfares. Huntington utilizes a grid-like street pattern featuring several wide boulevard-style avenues that run east and west. Most notable of these are Third and Fifth Avenues. The city has a numbered street naming system, with avenues running east and west (parallel to the Ohio River) and streets running north and south. The city is divided into an "East End" and a "West End" by First Street. Streets west of First Street carry as "West" indicator after the street name (i.e. "Fourteenth Street West"). The street plan was originally laid out by Andrew J. Enslow, a professional contractor, making Huntington one of the first professionally planned cities in America.

 Interstate 64, which skirts the South Hills with four interchanges that serve the city: US 52 (West Huntington Expressway), WV 152/WV 527, WV 10, and US 60. Exits 6 through 15 service the City of Huntington. US 52 is at exit 6. Heading north on the four-lane expressway leads to West Huntington and across the West Huntington Bridge into Ohio. Heading south overlaps the interstate west towards Kenova, where US 52 exits and heads south paralleling with the Big Sandy River. This is at exit 1. Exit 8: Similar to exit 11, WV 527's southern terminus lies at the north side of I-64. WV 152 makes its northern terminus on the south side of the interstate. The two highways are the renumbered U.S. 52 that moved to a new route in 1979 south of Kenova. Both routes terminate into each other at exit 8. Exit 11: Hal Greer Boulevard (WV 10), north of I-64. South of I-64 the highway is known is 16th Street Road. The quickest way to Marshall University is at exit 11. Exit 15: US 60 near West Pea Ridge. US 60 west heads toward downtown.

 Interstate 73 and Interstate 74 are programmed to run concurrent with US 52 throughout western West Virginia. It is slated to use the Tolsia Highway near Kenova and the West Huntington Expressway near West Huntington's Old Central City neighborhood.

 U.S. Route 60 is part of the historic Midland Trail enters the city coming from Barboursville in the east at exit 11 off Interstate 64. U.S. 60 heads toward downtown, splitting into the 3rd and 5th avenues, just west of the WV 2 terminus. U.S. Route 60 parallels the Ohio River through downtown, and merges into a four-lane undivided highway after crossing under the West Huntington Expressway (U.S. Route 52) in the West End. U.S. 60 exits the city in the west near the Camden Park.

 U.S. Route 52 (West Huntington Expressway) is a four lane expressway that enters Huntington from Ohio via the West Huntington Bridge from Chesapeake, Ohio in the north, and heads south crossing U.S. 60 in the West End. U.S. 52 then turns west, overlapping Interstate 64 beginning at exit 6, just south of Huntington city limits. Along with West Virginia Route 75, U.S. 52 heads south from the intersection, paralleling the Big Sandy River and US 23, which parallels the river on the Kentucky side of the river. From one mile (1.6 km) south of Kenova, it is known as the Tolsia Highway for many miles through Wayne County.

 West Virginia Route 2 makes its southern terminus just north of Huntington at U.S. Route 60. WV 2, which parallels the entirety of West Virginia's section of the Ohio River, and facilitates much traffic towards Point Pleasant and Parkersburg.

 West Virginia Route 10 follows the Guyandotte River for much of its length and connects Huntington to Princeton. It enters the city south of Interstate 64 at Hal Greer Boulevard. North of I-64 the highway is known as 16th Street. The highway's northern terminus is in downtown just south of the Ohio River at U.S. Route 60, near Marshall University.

 West Virginia Route 101
WV 101 is an unsigned highway which runs for less than a mile, connecting Third Avenue (US 60) with Rotary Park. Until 1990, this was an alignment of US 60.

 West Virginia Route 106
WV 106 enters the Huntington neighborhood of Guyandotte, via the East End Bridge from Proctorville. The highway crosses WV Route 2, and immediately terminates at U.S. Route 60, across the 3rd and 5th avenue split.

 West Virginia Route 152
WV 152's northern terminus is just shy of the city at Interstate 64. Continuing north changes to WV 527.

 West Virginia Route 527
WV 527 crosses south into Huntington from Chesapeake, Ohio, via the Robert C. Byrd Bridge. WV 527 then travels through downtown as 5th Street and exits the city at Interstate 64, which serves as the highway's southern terminus. Continuing south will lead into WV 152.

Bridges

The city has connections over the Ohio River to Proctorville, Ohio via the East Huntington Bridge, and to Chesapeake, Ohio via the Robert C. Byrd Bridge and the West Huntington Bridge.

The Robert C. Byrd Bridge is a  continuous truss automobile bridge that crosses the Ohio River between Huntington, West Virginia and Chesapeake, Ohio. The crossing was constructed to replace an old, narrow two lane structure that was demolished after 69 years of service in a spectacular implosion on July 17, 1995. The previous bridge, opened in 1926, was Huntington's first bridge across the Ohio River and was designed in a gothic style, complete with four two-ton spires that rested on top of each peak. The ground breaking ceremonies for the four-lane bridge was held on April 30, 1991.

The old 6th Street Bridge closed in the summer of 1993 to allow for the construction of the ramps and approaches in West Virginia and Ohio. The new bridge was named the Robert C. Byrd Bridge under an executive order from former Governor Gaston Caperton to honor the U.S. senator from West Virginia who is credited with obtaining the funding for the project that was completed on November 6, 1994. The $32.6 million bridge was constructed with $1.4 coming from Ohio, $5.6 coming from West Virginia, and $25.3 in federal funds. The famous spires, which once adorned the top of the former span, were saved. One is currently on display outside of the Chesapeake city hall at the intersection of State Route 7 and the Robert C. Byrd Bridge. Two others are installed along 9th Street between 3rd and 5th Avenues.

The East Huntington Bridge (officially the "Frank Gatski Memorial Bridge", also called the "East End Bridge" or the "31st Street Bridge") is a  cable-stayed bridge crossing the Ohio River at Huntington, West Virginia. It carries WV 106 on the West Virginia approach and OH 775 on the Ohio approach. The history of the span dates to the early 1970s when possible routings for a future Ohio River span were being discussed. To conform to the Huntington city comprehensive plan, the alignment preferred by the city was one that connected to Interstate 64 outside of the city boundaries. Many favored a plan about one mile (1.6 km) north of the city along WV 2.

Work began on the bridge in 1983 and was completed in August 1985 at a cost of $38 million. The designer of the bridge was Arvid Grant and Associated of Olympia, Washington and was the first bridge of its type in West Virginia. It was only the second of its kind in the United States since it utilized concrete instead of steel for its construction. It was built as a FHWA demonstration project. The Ohio River span and approach ramps on both sides of the river completed was what was known as Phase I. Future plans involved tolling the bridge and connecting it to U.S. Route 60 four blocks east The bridge was renamed for Marshall University's first member of the Pro Football Hall of Fame, Frank "Gunner" Gatski, during halftime of the Marshall-UTEP Football game on November 18, 2006.

Rail

 Since its founding as the western terminus of the C&O Railroad, Huntington has served as a major break of bulk point between rail traffic and the Ohio River/Mississippi River watershed. The Huntington Division is still the largest in the CSX Transportation network. A large portion of the division's revenue comes from hauling coal out of the coalfields of West Virginia and Eastern Kentucky. Much of the coal is brought to the Port of Huntington-Tristate by train to be transported by river barges to industrial centers in other parts of the United States.

Huntington is in the company's Southern Region and is the largest of ten operating divisions on the network. The division comprises the former railroads Chesapeake and Ohio (C&O); Baltimore and Ohio (B&O); Western Maryland (WM); Louisville and Nashville (L&N); and the Clinchfield. It serves the states of Kentucky, Tennessee, Virginia, West Virginia and Ohio. CSX's Huntington Division main office is in the historical former C&O passenger station in downtown Huntington. The building is home to the division's top managers, a centralized yardmasters and train dispatchers center, a freight car light repair shop and a locomotive heavy repair facility in the city.

The city was once a major hub for passenger rail service, but it now accounts for a significantly smaller portion of rail traffic than in the early decades of the 20th century.

The Amtrak station is on the Cardinal line running three days a week (Wednesday, Friday, Sunday) between New York City and Chicago via Washington, D.C., Charlottesville, Virginia, Cincinnati, and Indianapolis. The station at 1050 8th Avenue contains a waiting room and ticket office, as well as a platform on the south side of the east-west tracks, a small parking lot, and a small building in between.

The Amtrak station is six blocks south and two blocks west of the Tri-State Transit Authority Transit Center, where most TTA bus routes and Greyhound Buses stop. For closer connections, riders can take advantage of TTA Routes 2, 4, 5, 6, 10, which pass only two blocks away at 4th Avenue.

Those connections are not always practical under the current Cardinal schedule. The passengers arriving on the eastbound train, arriving from Chicago about 7:15 a.m. can easily transfer to any route that serves the Transit Center. But few bus routes are running after the westbound train departs around 9:50 p.m. Except for the few PM routes, most TTA routes stop running hours before the westbound train arrives, limiting options for any passengers who are either boarding or disembarking from the train.

Public transit

Tri-State Transit Authority (TTA) provides fixed-route bus service throughout Huntington and the surrounding area. Interchange buses provide links between Huntington and Chesapeake, Ohio, and between Ironton and Ashland, Kentucky, where transfers are available to the Ashland Bus System. However the system does not interchange between the TTA and the City of Ashland Bus Service in Ceredo, West Virginia.

The TTA also was involved in a joint venture with the Charleston, West Virginia-based Kanawha Valley Regional Transportation Authority bus system called Intelligent Transit which linked downtown Huntington to Charleston via bus. All bus routes began and ended at the old Greyhound Bus Depot in downtown Huntington, which is now known as the TTA Center. The service from Huntington to Charleston ceased in 2015. TTA bus services operate on Monday to Saturday between 6:00 a.m. and 11:15 p.m.

River

The Port of Huntington-Tristate is the largest inland port in the United States in terms of total tonnage and ton-miles. This is due in large part to the coal traffic from the railroads and the petroleum products produced by the Marathon Petroleum oil refinery in nearby Catlettsburg, Kentucky that use the Port of Huntington/Tri-State to load their products onto barges.

Air
The public Tri-State Airport, southwest of the city, has two runways. Commercial air service is provided by Allegiant Air and American Eagle.

Notable people

 Michael Cerveris: theater performer as Hedwig in "Hedwig and the Angry Inch"
 Don Chafin: sheriff of Logan County, commander in Battle of Blair Mountain
 Justice M. Chambers: Medal of Honor recipient
 Franklin Cleckley: West Virginia Supreme Court justice
 Larry Coyer: NFL and college football coach, defensive co-ordinator with Indianapolis Colts
 Dagmar: 1950s television personality
 Diamond Teeth Mary: blues singer
 Brad Dourif: Academy Award-nominated actor
 Joan C. Edwards: singer, entrepreneur
 Delos Carleton Emmons: lieutenant general, U.S. Army Air Force
 Robert E. Femoyer: Medal of Honor recipient
 David Ginsburg: (1912–2010), presidential adviser, executive director of Kerner Commission
 Hal Greer (1936-2018): professional basketball player, selected among 50 greatest NBA players of all time
 Jim Grobe: college football coach, Baylor, Wake Forest
 Chase Harrison: professional soccer player
 Henry D. Hatfield: former Governor of West Virginia
 Hawkshaw Hawkins: country music singer
 Eloise Hughes Smith: survivor of RMS Titanic
 Jackie Hunt: College Football Hall of Fame member
 Albert G. Jenkins: Confederate brigadier general
 Evan Jenkins: Former State Senator, Congressman, and WV Supreme Court Justice 
 Katie Lee: celebrity and television personality
 Craig Johnson: novelist
 Shane Keister: studio musician, writer, arranger, and producer
 Julia Keller: journalist, author, Pulitzer Prize recipient 
 Carwood Lipton: WW2 military officer, prominently featured in book and TV series Band of Brothers
 Brooklyn Nelson: actress
 Peter Marshall: actor, singer, television personality and game show host
 O. J. Mayo: former University of Southern California and Milwaukee Bucks basketball player
 Diamond Teeth Mary Smith McClain: blues and soul singer
 Clint McElroy: radio personality and podcaster
 Griffin McElroy: journalist and podcaster
 Justin McElroy: journalist and podcaster
 Travis McElroy: podcaster
 Carol Miller: U.S Representative from WV-3rd Congressional District
 Jeff Morrison: professional tennis player
 Dwight Morrow: businessman, politician and diplomat
 Patrick Patterson: former University of Kentucky and current Oklahoma City Thunder basketball player
 Rick Reed: former Major League Baseball pitcher and 2-time All-Star
 Seven Day Jesus: Dove Award-nominated Christian band
 Michael W. Smith: musician, charted in contemporary Christian and mainstream; born in Kenova, West Virginia
 Ruth C. Sullivan: co-founder of Autism Society of America and of Autism Services Center in Huntington
 Milton Supman: known professionally as Soupy Sales, comedian, actor, radio/television personality
 Jim Thornton: announcer on Wheel of Fortune
 Bill Walker: former Kansas State and Miami Heat basketball player
 Kayla Williams: U.S. gymnast, world vault gold medalist
 Carter G. Woodson: founder of Black History Month
 Steve Yeager (born 1948): former Major League Baseball catcher, co-MVP of 1981 World Series
 John Legg: TV Writer, Pop Up Video

Gallery

See also
List of cities and towns along the Ohio River
List of ports in the United States
USS Huntington, 3 ships

References

Bibliography

External links

Huntington during the 1937 flood 

Huntington Data

 
Cities in West Virginia
Cities in Cabell County, West Virginia
Cities in Wayne County, West Virginia
County seats in West Virginia
Populated places on the Guyandotte River
West Virginia populated places on the Ohio River
Populated places established in 1871
1871 establishments in West Virginia